Ajibade Aji Omolade (born June 12, 1984) is a Nigerian footballer.

Career

Nigeria
Omolade began his professional career with El-Kanemi Warriors in Maiduguri Borno state. He moved to Enyimba International F.C. As the club captain Omolade lead the team to African champions league twice and he won the CAF Champions League in 2003 and 2004. He also won The CAF Super Cup two times with the club.

Germany
He first moved out of Nigeria In July 2007, he was on trial at 1. FC Köln. in Germany, later he returned to Nigeria to join his old club Enyimba International F.C. he played a few matches there and later the club loaned him out to Gombe United F.C. in the Nigerian Premier League.

Sudan
In 2009 he joined the Sudanese club Al Hilal Omdurman on a four-year deal. After one year he returned to Nigeria where he sign one-year deal with Plateau United in the Nigerian Premier League. Later he joined Enugu Rangers. In 2013 he joined Niger Tornadoes Football Club

International career
In the year 2000 he represented Nigeria U20 at the U20 Africa Cup of Nations in Ethiopia.

Honours

Club

2003 CAF Champions League Cup Winner with Enyimba International F.C.

2004 CAF Champions League Cup winner with Enyimba International F.C.

Four times Nigeria Premier League Cup winner with Enyimba International F.C.

Nigerian Coca-Cola F.A Cup winner with Enyimba International F.C.

Sudanese F.A Cup winner with Al-Hilal Omdurman

References

1984 births
Living people
Yoruba sportspeople
Nigerian footballers
Association football midfielders
Nigerian expatriate sportspeople in Sudan
Enyimba F.C. players
Expatriate footballers in Sudan
Gombe United F.C. players
El-Kanemi Warriors F.C. players
Plateau United F.C. players
Al-Hilal Club (Omdurman) players